Lesbian, gay, bisexual, and transgender (LGBT) persons in the Central African Republic face legal and social challenges not experienced by non-LGBT residents. Both male and female same-sex sexual activity is legal in the Central African Republic, but LGBT persons face stigmatization among the broader population.

The Central African Republic was one of the few African states that signed a "joint statement on ending acts of violence and related human rights violations based on sexual orientation and gender identity" at the United Nations, condemning violence and discrimination against LGBT people.

Laws regarding same-sex sexual activity

Same-sex sexual activity is legal. However, according to the U.S. Department of State's 2012 human rights report, The penal code criminalizes "public expression of love" between persons of the same sex is imprisonment for six months to two years or a fine of between 150,000 and 600,000 CFA francs ($300 and $1,200). When one of the participants is a child, the adult may be sentenced to two to five years' imprisonment or a fine of 100,000 to 800,000 CFA francs ($200 and $1,600); however, there were no reports that police arrested or detained persons [in 2012] under these provisions.

Recognition of same sex relationships

There is no legal recognition of same-sex couples.

Same-sex marriage is constitutionally banned as marriage is defined in Article 7 of the Constitution as "the union between one man and one woman ... Family and marriage are under the protection of the State."

Adoption and family planning

According to a website of the French government, single and married people are eligible to adopt children. The website does not say whether single LGBT people are disqualified or not.

Living conditions

The U.S. Department of State's 2012 Human Rights Report found that,

There were no reports of the government targeting gays and lesbians. However, societal discrimination against lesbian, gay, bisexual and transgender persons was entrenched, and many citizens attributed the existence of homosexuality to undue Western influence. There were no known organizations advocating or working on behalf of the lesbian, gay, bisexual, or transgender persons.

Summary table

See also

Human rights in the Central African Republic
LGBT rights in Africa

References

Central African Republic
LGBT in the Central African Republic
Politics of the Central African Republic
Law of the Central African Republic
Human rights in the Central African Republic